The 2021–22 season was the 120th season in the existence of FC Girondins de Bordeaux and the club's 28th consecutive season in the top flight of French football. In addition to the domestic league, Bordeaux participated in this season's edition of the Coupe de France.

Bordeaux were allowed to stay in the top flight after their appeal against relegation to Ligue 2 along with Angers were accepted. Bordeaux had a disastrous campaign, finishing bottom and relegated to the second division. On 14 June, its relegation to the Championnat National (third tier) due to financial issues was confirmed. However, this decision was later overturned by the FFF executive committee.

Players

First-team squad

On loan

Transfers

In

Out

Pre-season and friendlies

Competitions

Overall record

Ligue 1

League table

Results summary

Results by round

Matches
The league fixtures were announced on 25 June 2021.

Coupe de France

References

FC Girondins de Bordeaux seasons
Bordeaux